The South Pahroc Range is a mountain range in Lincoln County, Nevada.

References 

Mountain ranges of Nevada
Mountain ranges of Lincoln County, Nevada